The following lists events that happened during 2014 in Kazakhstan.

Incumbents
President: Nursultan Nazarbayev
Prime Minister: Serik Akhmetov (until 2 April) Karim Massimov (from 2 April)

Events

April
 April 16 – A Soyuz-U rocket carrying a new Egyptian communication satellite, EgyptSat-2, was launched from the Baikonur Cosmodrome.

May
 May 29 – President Nursultan Nazarbayev and the heads of Russia and Belarus sign a treaty forming the Eurasian Economic Union.

December
 December 22 – Kazakhstan renews its military cooperation with Ukraine, to which it promises vital supplies of coal, following a visit to Kyiv by President Nursultan Nazarbayev.

References

 
Years of the 21st century in Kazakhstan
2010s in Kazakhstan
Kazakhstan
Kazakhstan
Kazakhstan